The Green Party of Aotearoa New Zealand, commonly known as the Greens, is a green and left-wing political party in New Zealand. Like many green parties around the world, it has four organisational pillars (ecological wisdom, social justice, grassroots democracy, and nonviolence). The party's ideology combines environmentalism with left-wing and social-democratic economic policies, including well-funded and locally controlled public services within the confines of a steady-state economy. Internationally, it is affiliated with the Global Greens.

The Green Party traces its origins to the Values Party, founded in 1972 as the world's first national-level environmentalist party. The current Green Party was formed in 1990. From 1991 to 1997 the party participated in the Alliance, a grouping of five left-wing parties. It gained representation in parliament at the 1996 election.

Historically, the Green Party had two co-leaders, one male and one female. In May 2022, Green Party members voted to change the co-leadership model, now requiring one female leader and one leader of any gender, and that one leader must be Māori. Marama Davidson has been the female co-leader since 2018 and James Shaw has served as co-leader from 2015–2022 and 2022–present.

It is the third-equal largest party in the House of Representatives, with 10 MPs. In 2020, the party agreed to cooperate with the Sixth Labour Government and received two ministerial portfolios in return. The Green Party contests many local government elections throughout New Zealand. Green Party representative Celia Wade-Brown served as Mayor of Wellington from 2010 to 2016, and in 2019, Aaron Hawkins was elected as the Mayor of Dunedin. In Auckland, the Green Party campaigns with the Labour Party, under the City Vision political banner.

Principles and policies

The Green Party was founded to counter what it sees as the threats to the natural environment. Environmental issues remain its main focus. In recent times, it has expressed concerns about mining of national parks, fresh water, peak oil and the release of genetically engineered organisms. The party strongly supports efforts to address climate change based on scientific evidence, by transitioning away from the burning of fossil fuels to renewable energy production, as well as making carbon pricing more transparent and bringing the agricultural sector into the Emissions Trading Scheme.

The Green Party has spoken out in support of human rights and against military operations conducted by the United States and other countries in Afghanistan and Iraq. The party is also known for its advocacy on numerous social issues, such as the legalisation of marriage equality, the right to seek asylum and increasing the refugee quota, and gender equality.

In its economic policies, the Green Party stresses factors such as sustainability, taxing the indirect costs of pollution, and fair trade. It also states that measuring economic success should concentrate on measuring well-being rather than analysing economic indicators. The party wants the eventual introduction of a universal basic income.

The party has previously campaigned on legalising cannabis and "remov[ing] penalties for any person with a terminal illness, chronic or debilitating condition to cultivate, possess or use cannabis and/or cannabis products for therapeutic purposes, with the support of a registered medical practitioner". In the 2017–2020 term of the Sixth Labour Government, medicinal cannabis was legalised, but legalisation of recreational cannabis use was rejected in a 2020 referendum.

The Greens rely heavily on the well-educated, urban demographic for their voter base. Green voters have various priorities but are likely to have a high regard for the environment and environmental issues. However, research indicates very few people who vote Green do so purely for environmental concerns.

History

Foundations

The Green Party traces its origins to the Values Party, the world's first national-level environmentalist party. The Values Party originated in 1972 at Victoria University of Wellington. While it gained a measure of public support in several elections, the then first-past-the-post electoral system meant that the party did not win any seats in the House of Representatives. Some of the founding members of the Green Party of Aotearoa New Zealand, notably Jeanette Fitzsimons, Rod Donald and Mike Ward, had been active members of the Values Party at the outset of the Green movement in the 1970s.

At the 1989 local-body elections multiple candidates stood for local government positions under the "Green" label. It saw the election of New Zealand's first Green city councillor, Stephen Rainbow, in Wellington. He was joined the next year by councillor Merrin Downing, who left the Citizens' Association to join the Greens.

In May 1990, remnants of the Values Party merged with a number of other environmentalist organizations to form the modern Green Party. This sparked a resurgence of support, with the new group winning 6.85% of the vote (but no seats) in the 1990 election.

The Alliance years
The following year, the Greens became co-founding members of the Alliance, a five-party grouping that also consisted of the Democrats, Liberals, Mana Motuhake and NewLabour Party. Immediately prior to this there had been limited co-operation between the parties running joint candidates in several local-body by-elections in Auckland. One candidate, Ruth Norman, was from the Greens and was elected to the Auckland Regional Council. At the Alliance's inaugural party conference in November 1992 party members elected Jeanette Fitzsimons from the Greens as a co-deputy leader of the Alliance.

The Greens contested the 1993 and 1996 elections as part of the Alliance. Membership of the Alliance was a controversial decision with a sizable minority in the party remaining opposed to it. Consequently the party was plagued in the following few years by persistent calls for departure from the Alliance. Over time the issue became a more divisive issue internally until eventually a splinter party (the Progressive Green Party) was set up by members who were unhappy at the direction of the Alliance which they believed was too left-wing and focused on social justice type issues, detracting focus from environmental issues.

Until the 1995 annual conference in Taupo, the Greens had no elected leaders. At that conference, Fitzsimons was elected unopposed as female co-leader, and Donald defeated Joel Cayford and Mike Smith in a three-way contest to become male co-leader.

After New Zealand adopted the mixed-member proportional (MMP) electoral system in 1996, the Alliance gained entry to Parliament, bringing three Green list MPs with them: Fitzsimons, Donald and Phillida Bunkle.

In 1997, feeling that membership of the Alliance had subsumed their identity, the Greens took the decision to stand candidates independently of the Alliance at the next election. While most of the Green party members left the Alliance, some decided instead to leave the Green Party and stay in the Alliance (including Bunkle, who would later be appointed Minister of Customs in the Labour-Alliance coalition government). Conversely, some of the Alliance party members who joined the Alliance via other parties decided to leave the Alliance and join the Green Party, notably Sue Bradford and Keith Locke, who both joined the Alliance via NewLabour.

Green Party in Parliament

1999 election
In the 1999 election, the Greens gained 5.16% of the vote and seven seats in Parliament. Fitzsimons also won the electorate seat of Coromandel. It is believed that this is the first time a Green candidate won a first-past-the-post parliamentary election. During the ten days it took to count special votes and confirm Fitzsimons' election, Labour concluded a coalition agreement with the Alliance which excluded the Greens. However, the party supported the government on confidence and supply in return for some input into the budget and legislation. This led to the Greens gaining a $15 million energy efficiency and environmental package in the new government's first budget. Over the term, the Greens developed a good working relationship with the government and also had some input into policy, notably Sue Bradford's amendments to the Employment Relations Act 2000.

2002 election
In the 2002 election, the Greens polled 7.00%, increasing their strength in Parliament to nine seats, although they lost the Coromandel electorate. The electoral campaign featured strong tensions between the Greens and Labour. The Greens sharply criticised Labour for its plans to allow a moratorium on genetic engineering to expire, and believing that Labour would require their support to form a government, intended to make the extension of this moratorium a non-negotiable part of any deal. After the election, however, Labour and their coalition partner, the Jim Anderton-led Progressive Coalition, instead opted to rely on support from United Future, a party with conservative Christian overtones.

Although the Greens no longer had any input into the budget, they maintained a close working relationship with the government, and the Greens remained involved in the legislation process. Often the government needed to rely on Green votes in the House to pass legislation not approved by United Future, a conservative family-values party. The government won praise from political commentators for juggling the two diametrically-opposed parties.

While the moratorium on genetic modification has now expired, the Greens remain heavily involved in attempts to prevent any GM releases under the new regulatory framework, and genetic engineering remains a major topic for the party.

2005 election
In the 2005 election, the Greens won 5.30%, returning six of their MPs to Parliament. Despite expressing clear support for a Labour-led government during the campaign, they were excluded from the resulting coalition, due to a refusal by United Future and NZ First to work with the Greens in cabinet. They were, however, able to negotiate a cooperation agreement which saw limited input into the budget and broad consultation on policy. Both co-leaders were appointed as government spokespeople outside cabinet, with Fitzsimons responsible for Energy Efficiency, and Donald responsible for the Buy Kiwi Made campaign. However, Rod Donald died the day before Parliament was due to sit and the position of government spokesperson on Buy Kiwi Made was filled by Sue Bradford. Nándor Tánczos took up the vacant list position and the co-leader position remained vacant until a new co-leader, Russel Norman was elected at their 2006 annual general meeting. The other contenders for the position were Nándor Tánczos, David Clendon and former MP Mike Ward.
Bradford also introduced, in 2005, the members' bill that would become the Crimes (Substituted Section 59) Amendment Act 2007. The bill sought to outlaw the legal defence of "reasonable force" for parents prosecuted for assault against children. It led to widespread debate and accusations that MPs supporting the bill were fostering a 'nanny state' approach. Despite this, the Bill became law after it passed its third reading on 16 May 2007 with an overwhelming majority of 113 votes for and 7 votes against.

2008 election
In the 2008 election the Greens increased their share of the vote to 6.72%, enough for 9 MPs, even though there was a swing throughout the country to the National Party. This initially gave the Greens two extra MPs, but counting the special votes brought in a third. They became the third largest parliamentary party in New Zealand, and signed a memorandum of understanding with the governing National Party.

Metiria Turei was elected at the 2009 annual general meeting after former female co-leader Jeanette Fitzsimons stood down as an MP in February 2009.

2011 election
In the 2011 election, the Green Party received nearly a quarter of a million party votes (247,372), equating to 11.06% of the total valid party votes nationwide, earning them 14 seats in the 50th Parliament. This has been the Party's most successful election result to date. Preliminary results on election night showed them with 10.6% of the vote, equivalent to 13 seats, but special votes increased their support enough to gain an extra seat. They remained the third largest parliamentary party in New Zealand.

2014 election
In the 2014 general election, the Green Party's share of the party vote fell slightly to 10.70%. Despite this, they retained all of their 14 seats and remained the third largest party in Parliament.

James Shaw was elected at the party's 2015 annual general meeting over fellow MPs Gareth Hughes and Kevin Hague, and party member Vernon Tava. He succeeded Russel Norman, who resigned in November 2015 to work as Executive Director of Greenpeace Aotearoa New Zealand.

2017 election
The Green Party announced their final list of candidates for the 2017 election on 30 May 2017. During the party's campaign launch on 9 July, the Green Party proposed charging bottling companies a ten percent tax for exporting water with the resulting revenue being split between local councils and Māori tribes or iwi. In addition, the Greens announced that they would ban new resource consents for bottling companies until the establishment of a new comprehensive commercial water pricing scheme.

In July 2017, co-leader Metiria Turei criticised the populist New Zealand First party and its leader Winston Peters for alleged racism, particularly towards immigration. List MP Barry Coates also penned an article in the left-wing "The Daily Blog" claiming that the Greens would call a snap election rather than be excluded from a prospective Labour and New Zealand First coalition government. Turei and Coates' comments were fiercely criticised by both Peters and New Zealand First MP Tracey Martin, who warned that this would affect post-election negotiations between the two parties. Fellow co-leader Shaw later clarified that Coates' remarks did not represent Green Party policy.

On 16 July, in order to raise awareness of the inadequacies of the welfare system, Turei disclosed that she had committed benefit fraud in the past. Turei also advocated raising the domestic purposes benefit for families during the Green Party's electoral campaign. Her disclosure generated considerable interest from the media, politicians, and the New Zealand blogosphere. On 7 August, Green MPs Kennedy Graham and party whip David Clendon resigned as Green Party candidates due to their disagreement with Turei's actions and handling of the situation. They formally resigned from the Green Party's parliamentary caucus the following day after the party made moves to remove them "involuntarily."
 
On 9 August, Turei resigned as co-leader and as a list candidate, stating that the media scrutiny on her family had become unbearable. James Shaw remained the Green Party's sole leader for the 2017 election. Clendon stated that he would not be returning to the Green Party list despite Turei's resignation. Graham sought to return to the party list, but this was declined on 12 August by the Green Party Executive. Leader James Shaw indicated that there was considerable animosity within the Party towards Clendon and Graham for their actions.

On 17 August, it was reported that the Green Party had fallen by 11 points to 4 percent in the 1 News–Colmar Brunton Poll, below the 5 percent threshold needed to enter Parliament under New Zealand's mixed-member proportional system. The party's sharp drop in the opinion poll was attributed to negative publicity around the Green Party's infighting and the ascension of Jacinda Ardern as leader of the center-left Labour Party, the Greens' nominal ally. By contrast, the Roy Morgan opinion poll placed public support for the Green Party at 9 percent.

The 2017 general election returned eight Members of Parliament, with 6.3% of the party vote. The Green parliamentary caucus' newest members were Chlöe Swarbrick, who became the youngest member of the House, and Golriz Ghahraman, the first refugee member of the House.

Following the election results, Party Leader Shaw stated that the Greens would not be seeking a coalition with the National Party. He added that the Party was pursuing a coalition rather than a support agreement with the Labour and socially-conservative New Zealand First parties. On 9 October, the Greens leader Shaw took part in negotiations with the Labour Party.
During the coalition-forming negotiations, NZ First leader Peters turned down Shaw's invitation for the two parties to negotiate directly on the grounds that the Greens and Labour had campaigned together under a memorandum of understanding during the 2017 election.

First term in Government, 2017–2020 

In October 2017, the Greens entered a confidence and supply arrangement with the Labour Party which gave them three ministers outside cabinet and one under-secretary role. This marked the first time the Greens had been in government. Party leader James Shaw was appointed Minister for Climate Change and Statistics and Associate Minister of Finance. Julie Anne Genter was made Minister for Women and Associate Minister of Health and Transport. Eugenie Sage was made Minister of Conservation and Land Information and Associate Minister for the Environment. Jan Logie was appointed Parliamentary Undersecretary to the Minister of Justice with a focus on domestic and sexual violence issues.

As a support partner of the Labour-New Zealand First coalition government, the Greens secured several policies and concessions including a proposed Zero Carbon Act, a referendum on legalising personal cannabis use by 2020, establishing a proposed Climate Commission, a proposed Green Transport Card to reduce public transportation costs, investing in rail and cycle infrastructure, light rail construction to Auckland Airport, increasing the Department of Conservation's funding, eliminating "excessive" benefit sanctions and the gender pay gap, a rent-to-own-scheme as part of KiwiBuild, and re-establishing the Mental Health Commission.

In 2019, a number of Trans members resigned after a Green Party magazine published an article from a member concerned about the growing divide between women in the party and LGBTQIA+ members.

In late August 2020, Shaw was criticised by members of the Green Party, the opposition National Party, school principals and teachers unions for allocating, in his role as Associate Minister of Finance, NZ$11.7 million from the Government's $3 billion COVID-19 "shovel-ready" recovery fund to the private "Green School New Zealand" in Taranaki. This funding boost contradicted the party's own policy of opposing giving government funds to private schools. Shaw had lobbied for the inclusion of the school in the "shovel-ready" fund, claiming that it would have boosted the local economy and created jobs. 
Former Green MPs Catherine Delahunty, Mojo Mathers and Sue Bradford denounced Shaw's decision as a betrayal of the Green Party's policies and principles. Shaw subsequently apologised to Green MPs during a Zoom call, describing his action as an "error of judgment." On 2 November, it was reported that the Government had reached an agreement with the school's owners, Michael and Rachel Perrett, for the NZ$11.7 million grant to be converted into a loan; a development that was welcomed by local principals.

2020 election

During the 2020 New Zealand general election held on 17 October, the Greens returned to Parliament with 7.9 percent of the popular vote, giving them ten seats. In addition, Green MP Chlöe Swarbrick won the Auckland Central electorate seat by 1,068 votes.

Despite the Labour Party winning a parliamentary majority and not needing to form a coalition agreement with other parties, Labour and the Green parties undertook a series of discussions about areas of cooperation. Green co-leader James Shaw had indicated that the Greens would be open to negotiating with Labour about its wealth tax policy as part of coalition negotiations. Earlier, Prime Minister Jacinda Ardern had ruled out supporting the Green's wealth tax policy during campaigning. On 20 October, Newshub reported that Ardern was not seeking a formal coalition between Labour and the Green Party but was exploring a lower-level support arrangement.

Second term in Government, 2020–present
Following prolonged negotiations between the Green and Labour parties' leaderships, the Green Party accepted a deal on 31 October under which the Green Party's co-leaders James Shaw and Marama Davidson would become ministers outside the Cabinet. Under this cooperation agreement, Shaw would remain Minister for Climate Change and become an associate minister for the environment (with responsibility for biodiversity) while Davidson would take the new role of Minister for the Prevention of Family and Sexual Violence and become an associate minister of housing (with responsibility for homelessness). In addition, Green MPs would fill one chair and one deputy chair role on two select committees. Stuff reported that these would likely be held by former ministers Eugenie Sage and Julie Anne Genter on the Environment Committee and Transport Committee, respectively. During a Zoom call, 85% of the 150 Green Party delegates voted to accept this cooperation agreement with Labour.

The agreement was described by Ardern as "honouring the mandate provided to Labour to form a majority Government in our own right" while ensuring the Government "govern[s] for all New Zealanders and to reach as wide a consensus on key issues as possible." Several former Green MPs including former co-leader Russel Norman, Sue Bradford, and Catherine Delahunty criticised the cooperation agreement for giving the Greens a weak position to influence the policy process within the newly formed Labour Government.

On 19 May, Ghahraman sponsored a motion on behalf of the Green Party calling for Members of Parliament to recognise the right of Palestinians to self-determination and statehood. The motion was supported by the Greens and the Māori Party but was opposed by the centre-right National and ACT parties. The governing Labour Party also declined to support the Greens' motion with the Speaker of the House Trevor Mallard criticising Ghahraman for sponsoring the motion despite knowing that it was going to be voted down.

In June 2021, it was revealed the Green Party had received $54,000 in donations from Lindsay Fraser. Lindsay Fraser has been called the worst animal abuser in New Zealand history by the Royal New Zealand Society for the Prevention of Cruelty to Animals (RNZSPCA).

In July 2021, Shaw's co-leadership of the Greens was challenged by Dunedin climate activist and software developer James Cockle, who expressed dissatisfaction that the Greens were being seen as "Labour's little helper." During a vote at the party's annual general meeting in August 2021, Shaw was overwhelmingly re-elected, winning 116 delegate votes with just four to Cockle.

In January 2022, Radio New Zealand reported that several Green Party executive and policy branch members had resigned from the Party citing disagreement with the Green Party leadership's cooperation agreement with the governing Labour Party; taking issue with what they regarded as the Greens' perceived limited ability to hold the Government to account on policy differences. These former members also alleged Shaw was practising an autocratic leadership style and that the party executive was not holding the parliamentary caucus and leadership to account over policy decisions in government. In addition, several former Green leaders and MPs including Bradford, Delahunty, and Norman criticised the party's limited position within the Labour Government, the Government's alleged pro-business policies, and climate change position.  In response to criticism, co-leaders Shaw and Davidson claimed that the party was democratic and making "progressive changes" in government.

In early May 2022, the Green Party scrapped its male co-leadership requirement during a weekend special meeting to amend its constitution. Under these changes, the two new co-leaders now need to consist of one woman and one person of any gender (with leadership pathways for non-binary and intersex individuals). In addition, at least one of the future co-leaders is required to be of Māori descent.

On 23 July, an annual general meeting was held online to decide on the party's leadership. While Davidson was re-elected unopposed, 32 of the 107 delegates voted to reopen nominations for Shaw's position, meeting the 25% threshold needed to remove him as co-leader and trigger a leadership election under the party's rules. Shaw was criticised by elements within the party including Travis Mischewski and former Green MP Delahunty for his perceived "moderate leadership" and inability to effect change within the Labour Government and tackle climate change. On 25 July, Shaw confirmed that that he would contest the co-leadership election. That same day, fellow MPs Chlöe Swarbrick and Elizabeth Kerekere confirmed that they would not be contesting the co-leadership position.

On 10 September, Shaw was re-elected as Green Party co-leader by 142 (97%) of the 145 eligible delegates at the party's annual general meeting. Shaw was the only candidate to contest the 2022 co-leadership election.

Local body elections

2013 local elections
In the 2013 local elections, Greens won three city council and two regional council seats in Wellington, a council seat in Dunedin, and also enjoyed success in Christchurch and Gisborne.

2016 local elections
During the 2016 local elections, Green Dunedin candidate Aaron Hawkins was re-elected to the Dunedin City Council and was joined by the Green Party's first elected Pasifika representative, Councillor Marie Laufiso. During the 2016 Wellington local election, four Green candidates Sue Kedgley, Iona Pannett, Sarah Free, and David Lee were elected onto the Greater Wellington Regional Council and the Lambton, Eastern, and Southern Wards of the Wellington City Council. Several Green candidates also contested seats on the Auckland Council, local boards, and licensing trusts during the 2016 Auckland local body elections.

In addition, Brent Barrett was elected to Palmerston North City Council.

2019 local elections
The 2019 New Zealand local elections were the most successful local body elections ever for the party, culminating in 42 successful candidates. Notably, Aaron Hawkins was elected Mayor of Dunedin, becoming the first Green Party candidate to ever win a mayoralty in New Zealand.

In addition, Brent Barrett was re-elected to the Palmerston North City Council and was joined by a second Green candidate Renee Dingwall. Future Green MP Teanau Tuiono also ran for the position of Mayor of Palmerston North but was defeated by the incumbent Grant Smith.

2022 local elections
During the 2022 New Zealand local elections, ten Green candidates were elected to local government positions. Though Aaron Hawkins was defeated in his bid to be re-elected as Mayor of Dunedin, the Green-endorsed Tory Whanau was elected as Mayor of Wellington.

Green councillor Tamata Paul was elected to the Wellington City Council (WCC) and became the chair of its new environment and infrastructure committee. In addition, Laurie Foon and Nīkau Wi Neera were elected to the WCC's Southern General Ward and Te Whanganui-a-Tara Māori ward.

In addition, Yadana Saw, Thomas Nash, and Quentin Duthie were elected on the Green Party ticket to the Greater Wellington Regional Council.

Green councillor Brent Barrett was re-elected for a third term on the Palmerston North City Council (PNCC). In addition, Kaydee Zabelin was elected to the PNCC on the Green ticket.

In Otago, Marie Laufiso was elected to the Dunedin City Council as a councillor. In addition, Alan Somerville was elected to the Dunedin Regional Constituency of the Otago Regional Council.

Structure

Three-petal structure 
The Green Party has three leadership "petals" – bodies of equal standing in the Party. These are the executive, caucus and the policy committee.

Te Roopu Pounamu 
Te Roopu Pounamu ("TRP"), the party’s Māori network, is widely considered an informal fourth petal and is often given equal weighting by party members. Their Kaiwhakahaere (co-convenors) are equally often considered informal members of the parties Leadership Group.

Provinces and branches 
A province is a collection of branches which has sufficient sense of common identity defined by natural geographical boundaries. Branches are a collection of members with an electorate-based geographical area of responsibility.

Networks 
There are a number of identity or interest-based networks across the party. These include:
Green Women
Inclusive Greens (a network for members living with a disability)
Pasifika Greens (a network for members with Pacific Island ancestry)
Rainbow Greens (a network for LGBTQIA+ members)
GreenLeft (a network for left-wing, anti-capitalist members)
Te Roopu Pounamu (Māori network)
Union Greens
Young Greens

Electoral results

Parliament

Office holders
The party has six equal status office holders that form their leadership group:

 two co-leaders
 two party co-convenors (one male and one female)
 two policy co-convenors (one male and one female)

The co-leaders lead the caucus, the party co-convenors lead the party executive, and the policy co-convenors lead the policy committee. The leadership group facilitates high level discussion and co-ordination between the three committees.

Co-leaders

Co-convenors
Equivalent to the organisational president of other parties.
The Green Party constitution bars co-convenors from standing for parliament.  There is always one male co-convenor and one female co-convenor.

Policy co-convenors
Policy co-convenors are the leaders of the policy committee, which is autonomous from both the caucus and the party executive. While lower in public profile than the party co-convenors, the policy co-convenors are considered to have the same status as the party co-convenors, and are elected in the same way. There is always one male policy co-convenor and one female policy co-convenor.

Current members of parliament
The Green Party won 10 seats in the 2020 general election.

The MPs are, in order of their 2020 election list ranking:

See also

Green Party of Aotearoa New Zealand Front Bench
List of Green Party of Aotearoa New Zealand MPs
List of green political parties
Politics of New Zealand

References

External links
 
 
 Official blog
 
 
 

 
Green political parties in New Zealand
Political parties established in 1990
1990 establishments in New Zealand
New Zealand
Sustainability in New Zealand
Political parties supporting universal basic income